The Pashini class (パシニ) locomotives were a group of steam tender locomotives of the Chosen Government Railway (Sentetsu) with 4-6-2 wheel arrangement. The "Pashi" name came from the American naming system for steam locomotives, under which locomotives with 4-6-2 wheel arrangement were called "Pacific".

In all, Sentetsu owned 144 locomotives of all Pashi classes, of which 141 survived the war; of these, 73 went to the Korean National Railroad in South Korea and 68 to the Korean State Railway in North Korea.

Description

Following the success of the Pashii class, Sentetsu took delivery of six locomotives from ALCo of the United States in 1923. they were originally numbered パシ913–パシ918, but after six Japanese-built copies of the Pashii class were delivered later in the same year, in 1924 the ALCo engines were renumbered パシ919–パシ924 in order to free 913–918 up for the new Pashii units. When Sentetsu introduced its new numbering system in 1938, these engines were redesignated パシニ (Pashini) class and numbered パシニ1 through パシニ6.

These engines represented a milestone in Korean railway history, having been the very last class of locomotives imported by Sentetsu from outside the Japanese Empire.

Postwar: Korean State Railway 바시두 (Pasidu) class
After the partition of Korea, all six of the Pashini-class locomotives were in the North, and were taken over by the Korean State Railway (Kukch'ŏl) and were initially designated 바시두 (Pasidu) class. Little of their service lives in the North is known. It's uncertain whether they remained in service long enough to be renumbered with a four-digit serial number, and their subsequent fate is unknown; they were likely retired in the late 1960s or early 1970s.

After retirement, one of them, 바시두3, was fully restored to its original condition, including the original Sentetsu "パシニ3" number plates, and is now on display at the Wŏnsan Revolutionary Museum in Wŏnsan, which was opened in 1975 in Wŏnsan's original Sentetsu-built railway station building.

Construction

References

Locomotives of Korea
Locomotives of North Korea
Railway locomotives introduced in 1923
4-6-2 locomotives
ALCO locomotives